Ohio University Marching 110 is the official marching band of Ohio University in Athens, Ohio, founded in 1923. The nickname Marching 110 is a reference to the band's original number of members. The 2017 band consists of 240 members. It represents the university at various athletic functions and other events, including over 40 NFL halftime shows.

History

In 1923, a student by the name of Homer Baird started the first marching band at Ohio University.  In 1966, Gene Thrailkill joined the OU faculty as the director of bands at Ohio University.  Thrailkill brought with him a new high-energy marching style and new uniform, both of which remain the staple of the Marching 110 today.  Along with the style switch, Thrailkill also removed all women and majorettes from the band, keeping one Drum Major.  In 1967, the band became known as the "100 Marching Men of Ohio," and the following year the 110 members of the band were coined the "110 Marching Men of Ohio," cementing their name as the Marching 110 seen today.  In 1975, women were re-admitted to the Marching Band by Ronald Socciarelli, and remain so today. The Marching 110 also became the first collegiate marching band to perform in Carnegie Hall in 1976, marking one of their first prominent performances. In September of 2007, the 110 was nominated as the best college marching band in the nation by CollegeSports-Fans.com   and ranked as one of the "100 Things We Can't Wait To See This College Football Season" by Cinema News  in August 2010. The Marching 110 also participated in the 2010 Tournament of Roses Parade in Pasadena, California.

Directors

Gene Thrailkill
After arriving at Ohio University in 1966, Gene Thrailkill made changes to the Ohio University Marching Band.  While there were some controversial changes having to do with membership, he ultimately hoped to increase the band's size from approximately 85 members.  The following fall, 112 marchers were chosen to march in the new band.  Other changes included new traditional uniforms and a new style for the band.  With popular music of the day, hard-driving marching and a great "esprit-de-corps," the 110 Marching Men of Ohio began "The Most Exciting Band in the Land."  Thrailkill was also the originator of the 110's "Diamond Ohio" formation at Ohio University.  After The Ohio State University Marching Band used "Diamond Ohio", Thrailkill pushed for the "Diamond Ohio" formation to give the band its own trademark. Thrailkill was director of bands until 1971. Prior to his arrival to Ohio University in 1966, Thrailkill served as director of instrumental music for the New Lebanon Public Schools (Ohio).  He holds a Bachelor of Music degree from the University of Michigan and a Master of Music degree from Ohio University.  In 2000 Coach Thrailkill retired as Regents Professor and Professor of Music at the University of Oklahoma, where he took over in 1971.  He also served as director of University Bands and headed the extensive OU band program. The Marching 110 was honored to have Mr. Thrailkill speak and guest conduct the 110 at Homecoming 2001.  Mr. Thrailkill attended the Thursday, Friday and Saturday morning practices of the Marching 110, as well as the new OUMB Society of Alumni & Friends Display Case dedication ceremony in Memorial Auditorium. Coach died in 2021. The 110 dedicated a show to him that season wearing running ribbons featuring a green and red stripe to mark his time serving both at Ohio University and the University of Oklahoma. The 110 also dedicated their 2022 homecoming show to him as well.

Thomas Lee
Dr. Lee came to Ohio University in 1971 to conduct the Marching 110. Lee was also the founder and conductor of the Ohio University Wind Ensemble and received a research grant to develop an innovative approach to teach conducting. In 1985, Lee became the director of the UCLA Wind Ensemble, which he has raised to a level of national prominence.

Ronald P. Socciarelli
Professor Socciarelli was the director Marching 110 from 1972 to 1989. Under his direction, the Marching 110 as well as the wind ensemble toured extensively throughout the east and Midwest.  The wind ensemble was selected to perform several times at the Ohio Music Educators Association conferences and at the national meeting of the College Band Director's National Association Convention and at the National Music Teacher's Association Conference in Washington, DC. Professor Socciarelli earned degrees from Ithaca College and the University of Michigan, and he is an active guest conductor and clinician.  Presently, he holds the title of Professor Emeritus of Music, teaching the fall quarter of each year in the areas of conducting and literature.  He retired to Aiken, South Carolina. In 1997, members of the Ohio University Marching 110 were honored to hear Professor Socciarelli at their annual band banquet.  Then, in 2003, Socciarelli returned once again to conduct the Marching 110 and over 200 Alumni during the annual homecoming game during the celebration of Ohio University's Bicentennial, as well as speak at the annual Alumni Banquet.

Ronald Socciarelli died on February 2, 2012, and shortly after his death, Ohio University adopted his quote "Better Than the Best Ever" as the official theme for the 2012 Homecoming Celebrations.  On October 13, over 600 Marching 110 Alumni returned to Ohio University to pay tribute to "The Man."  The largest Alumni band in the history of Ohio University took to the streets of Athens in a homecoming celebration that was undoubtedly Better Than the Best Ever.

Sylvester Young
The Marching 110 was under Sylvester Young's direction from 1990 through 1996. The 1997 members of the Ohio University Marching 110 were also honored to hear Mr. Young speak at their annual band banquet. Mr. Young went on to be the director of the Florida A&M Marching 100 from 2013 through 2016.

Richard Suk 
Richard Suk is serving his twenty-sixth year as director of the Marching 110. He is also the conductor of the Symphonic Band and Varsity Band at Ohio University.

Instrumentation
The band marches clarinets, trumpets, mellophones, alto and tenor saxes, trombones and bass trombones, euphoniums, and sousaphones. The percussion section consists of eight snare drums, four timbales, four duo-tenor drums, four pitched bass drums, and four pitched cymbals.

Drum cadences
In parades, one of the high notes of 110's performance is their dance routines to drum cadences.  The following are some of the current and former drum cadences used by the 110.

7 & 1/2, Out of it, Cherry, Funk, Jimbo, Tequila, Gym Shorts, No!, Uncertain, Herb (retired), Robbers, Your Mother, Two Bucks, Cheesecake (retired), Grabbit, and the newest cadence, Green House.

Traditions

High Extended Chair-Step 
In 1967, under the direction of Gene Thraikill, the band switched to a high-step style marching. This style consisted of the thigh raised 90 degrees to the ground and the calf extended to 45 degrees. With this new and unique technique, the band also added a slight twist in the upper body giving the players a "swinging" effect referred to as "swagger". Together, they formed what is the permanent marching style that the Marching 110 have continued to use today.

Diamond Ohio 
This now well-known set is performed by the Marching 110 during pre-game. It was originally introduced when Gene Thrailkill designed a pregame set modeled after the Ohio State University Marching Band to give the newly reformed Marching 110 a symbol. The capital "H" with an "I" in the middle surrounded by two triangle shapes pointing away from the center gives the appearance of spelling out Ohio on the field.

Letterman Jackets 
One of the most prominent traditions in the Marching 110 is the dawning of green letterman jackets. Since 1967, the jacket has retained its same design. They feature a double striped woven collar, wrists, and waistband in a white on green scheme. The jacket itself is dark green in color and has two pockets as well as white buttons. The insignia on the back is the block letter spelling of Ohio and the front features a patch in the shape of Ohio with "Ohio University Marching Band' on it. Band members post pins above the front patch from various prominent performances as well as any band Greek life they are involved in. Members consider the jackets sacred and any non-members of the band are not allowed to wear them.

Uniforms 
In the fall of 1967, after Professor Gene Thrailkill took over the band, the uniforms went through a style update like most other aspects of the program.  The main uniform was inspired by the University of Michigan Marching Band from the early 70's. The jackets were changed to black sleeves and collars, with a white chest, braids and shoulder nests.  Across the chest 'OHIO' is printed in block letters on the diagonal in black, outlined by green.  The uniform police-style hats have a white trim with a design around the sides on a black background. A green and white plume was added to show off more of the school colors.  A black bibber with a white stripe down the leg was used to show off the band's great marching technique that is used.  They are recognized for the white and green short half capes that they wear on the backs of their jackets.  Lastly, shined black shoes with white spats were worn to better contrast with the green color of the turf grass used at the school's football field.

Dance Breaks 
The Marching 110 features at least one dance break per show. Designed by designated Dance Commanders, the whole band spends time learning moves to spice up their performance. Since 1967, the band has continued the tradition after Drum Major David Fowler created the first dance routine to a 110 standard "Ain't Been Good."

Other Traditions 

 Annual performances at the historic Ohio Theatre in Columbus, Ohio, and many previous performances at the Palace Theatre, also in Columbus, Ohio.
 Playing the hymn Salvation as well as other songs referred to as "standards." These songs include Ain't Been Good, Light Up, Long Train Running, Cheer, and Train of Thought.

Prominent performances

In addition to their annual Ohio Theatre Performance in Columbus, Ohio, the 110 has also performed for the following:
1968 Tangerine Bowl, Orlando, FL
1976 1st Collegiate Marching Band to perform in New York's famed Carnegie Hall
1987 Marched in the US Constitution Bicentennial Parade - Philadelphia, PA
1993 Performed in Bill Clinton's Inauguration Parade and ball, Washington D.C.
1998 Opening gala of the restored Allen Theater in Cleveland, Ohio
2000 Macy's Thanksgiving Day Parade, NYC
2005 Macy's Thanksgiving Day Parade, NYC
2006 MAC Championship Game in Detroit, MI vs. Central Michigan
2006 15 Members of the Marching 110 appeared as surprise guests on NBC's hit game-show Deal or No Deal.
2007 GMAC Bowl in Mobile, AL vs. Southern Mississippi
2009 MAC Championship Game in Detroit, MI vs. Central Michigan
2009 Little Caesars Pizza Bowl Game in Detroit, MI vs. Marshall University
2010 The Tournament of Roses Parade on New Years Day
2010 R+L Carriers New Orleans Bowl in New Orleans, LA, Ohio vs. Troy
2011 MAC Championship Game in Detroit, MI vs. Northern Illinois
2011 77 Members of the Marching 110 traveled to The Famous Idaho Potato Bowl in Boise, ID vs. Utah State
2012 AdvoCare V100 Independence Bowl in Shreveport, LA, Ohio vs. ULMONROE
2013 Europe Tour. Performed in Dublin Ireland, and Rome, in front of the Vatican
2013 Beef O' Brady's Bowl in St. Petersburg, FL vs. East Carolina
2015 Camelia Bowl in Montgomery, AL, vs. Appalachian State
2016 France Tour. Performed a memorial concert of patriotic songs at the cemetery at Omaha Beach in Normandy, the Champs-de-Mars under the Eiffel Tower, and in Disneyland Paris.
2016 MAC Championship Game in Detroit, MI vs. Western Michigan
2016 Dollar General Bowl in Mobile, Alabama vs. Troy
Has performed at games of the following Professional Football teams:
Cleveland Browns
Also filmed a half-time show for the Browns 75th anniversary during the COVID pandemic.
Pittsburgh Steelers
Washington Redskins
Buffalo Bills
New York Giants
Jacksonville Jaguars
Detroit Lions
Toronto Argonauts of the CFL
Cincinnati Bengals
Denver Broncos
New York Jets
 2017 Macy's Thanksgiving Day Parade, NYC
 2017 80 Members of the Marching 110 traveled to the Bahamas Bowl in Nassau, Bahamas, vs. UAB
 2018 Frisco Bowl in Frisco, Texas vs. San Diego State
 2019 82 Members of the Marching 110 traveled to The Famous Idaho Potato Bowl in Boise, ID vs Nevada Wolfpack.

The Lawlers 
In Emeriti Park on Ohio University’s campus, there is a stone carving of Diamond Ohio and a plaque that reads "In Memoriam 10-13-99, Jud & Frank Lawler, Marching 110 Alumni".

Jud and Frank Lawler were both members of the Marching 110. On October 13, 1999, the brothers were struck by a semi on their way home to see a Lynyrd Skynyrd concert. Tragically, they would both die from the accident. In the days following, both the Marching 110 and Graham High School Band performed at their funeral, playing some of the brothers' favorite songs. It’s reported that around 1,800 people attended their visiting hours.  They were dedicated members who had a combined total of 13 years with the Marching 110.

In the present years, the band can often be heard playing "Salvation is Created" (referred to by members as Salvation) in memory of Jud and Frank Lawler. Originally, it was introduced as a warmup but following their death, it was dedicated to the brothers. When played, any alumni and current members of the Marching 110 in the area remove their hats and sunglasses and stand in silence, paying homage to the brothers. In 2019, the Marching 110 dedicated their homecoming half-time show to the brothers which included songs by the pair's favorite bands.

Present
Today, the band continues to honor its long held traditions of over 5 decades. They continue to perform at every home game and make music for students and fans alike to enjoy.

Going viral
On October 1, 2011 the Marching 110 performed "The Party Rock Anthem" by LMFAO as the dance chart to conclude its halftime show. A video of the performance was uploaded to YouTube.com, and within days had accumulated more than 1 million views. The video earned the Marching 110 worldwide recognition and was featured on many prominent websites including ESPN and CNN.com. To date, the video has reached almost 12 million views.

On September 22, 2012, the Marching 110 again went viral with the Korean singer PSY's hit "Gangnam Style". The video was taken down by someone who hacked the YouTube account and deleted the video. It was re-uploaded a few days later with the views set back to 0.  To date, the video has been viewed more than 8,800,000 times.  Featured on Good Morning America and through several other prominent media outlets, the Marching 110 has gained considerable recognition in a year when Ohio Athletics are at their best in a generation.

References

External links
 

 

Mid-American Conference marching bands
Ohio University
Musical groups established in 1923
1923 establishments in Ohio